The City National Bank is an historic building in Tuscaloosa, Alabama. It was designed in the Classical Revival Style by William Leslie Welton and was built in 1922.  It was listed on the National Register of Historic Places in 1985.

It is also a contributing building in the Downtown Tuscaloosa Historic District, NRHP-listed in 1985.

References

External links

Bank buildings on the National Register of Historic Places in Alabama
National Register of Historic Places in Tuscaloosa County, Alabama
Neoclassical architecture in Alabama
Commercial buildings completed in 1922
Buildings and structures in Tuscaloosa, Alabama